Le Cimetière des arlequins is the second album by the French progressive rock band Ange, released in 1973.

Track listing 
 "Ces gens-là" (Jacques Brel) – 4:45
 "Aujourd'hui c'est la fête chez l'apprenti-sorcier" (J.M. Brézovar/C. Décamps) – 3:30
 "Bivouac (1ère partie)" (C. Décamps/F. Décamps) – 5:27
 "L'Espionne lesbienne" (C. Décamps/D. Haas) – 2:50
 "Bivouac (final)" (C. Décamps/F. Décamps) – 3:00
 "De temps en temps" (C. Décamps/F. Décamps) – 4:04
 "La Route aux cyprès" (C. Décamps/D. Haas) – 3:20
 "Le Cimetière des arlequins" (C. Décamps/G. Jelsch) – 8:47

Personnel 
 Jean Michel Brezovar – Guitars, Flute, Vocals
 Christian Décamps – Piano, Keyboards, Hammond organ, Vocals
 Francis Decamps – Keyboards, Mellotron, Vocals
 Daniel Haas –	Bass and Acoustic guitar 
 Gerald Jelsch – Drums, Percussion

Release history

References 

1973 albums
Ange albums